Sophia Taylor Ramsey Ali is an American actress. She is best known for her work in the MTV romantic comedy series Faking It, the ABC medical drama series Grey's Anatomy, and The Wilds.

Life
Ali is Pakistani American. She was born in San Diego, California, but her family was living in Dubai at the time. When she was ten days old, she and her mother flew to Dubai. She lived there until age four, when her family relocated to Texas. When Ali was 19 years old, she moved to California to pursue an acting career.

Although many of Ali's family members practice Islam, her parents did not "nudge her" towards any religion. 

Ali was a dancer until the age of 16, and her hobbies include watercolor painting and graffitiing furniture. She has several tattoos.

Career
In 2003, she made her debut on the television show K Street. Ali appeared in a variety of TV shows and films including Faking It, Shake It Up, CSI: Miami, Missionary Man and Famous in Love. 

In 2017, Ali was cast in a recurring role as Dr. Dahlia Qadri in the ABC medical drama series Grey's Anatomy. In 2018, Ali appeared as Penelope in the Blumhouse supernatural thriller film Truth or Dare. In 2022, Ali starred in the role of Chloe Frazer in the Uncharted film. The film was released to mixed reviews, with Ali's performance receiving praise.

Filmography

Film

Television

Web

Music videos

References

External links
 

21st-century American actresses
Actresses from San Diego
American film actresses
American television actresses
Living people
American people of Pakistani descent
Year of birth missing (living people)